Acrepidopterum minutum is a species of beetle in the family Cerambycidae. It was described by Fisher in 1926.

References

Apomecynini
Beetles described in 1926